This is a list of countries by a simple average of commercial banks' annualized interest rates charged on new loans to their most credit-worthy customers. Each entry is denominated in the respective national currency.

List

References

Lists of countries by economic indicator
Countries by Commercial Bank Prime Lending Rate
Interest rates